Tingini is a tribe of lace bugs in the family Tingidae. There are at least 250 genera and 2,400 described species in Tingini.

ITIS Taxonomic notes: 
The family-group name Tingidae is attributed to Laporte, but the year is variously given as 1831 to 1833. At the superfamily rank there is a potential priority conflict between Tingoidea Laporte (1831-1833?) and Miroidea Hahn (1831-1833?), as the family group name Miridae is attributed to Hahn, and is variously dated to 1831 to 1833, as well. Until this issue is resolved, ITIS will follow the common practice of using Miroidea over Tingoidea, and will leave the various family-group names (ranked from tribe to superfamily, see Principle of Coordination) without authorship.
Note that per ICZN Opinion 143, the family name is Tingidae (not Tingitidae, nor Tingiidae), so the stem is Ting-, and the correctly formed tribe name would be Tingini (not Tingitini, nor Tingiini).

Selected genera

An incomplete list of Tingini genera includes:
 Abdastartus Distant, 1910
 Acalypta Westwood, 1840
 Acanthocheila Stål, 1858
 Aeopelys Drake and Ruhoff, 1965
 Agramma Stephens, 1829
 Atheas Champion, 1898
 Bako Schouteden, 1923
 Belenus Distant, 1909
 Bunia Schouteden, 1955
 Calotingis Drake, 1918
 Campylosteira Fieber, 1844
 Catoplatus Spinola, 1837
 Corythucha Stål, 1873
 Derephysia Spinola, 1837
 Diconocoris Mayr, 1865
 Dictyla Stål, 1874
 Dictyonota Curtis, 1827
 Kalama Puton in Lethierry and Puton, 1876
 Lasiacantha Stål, 1873
 Oncochila Stål, 1873
 Physatocheila Fieber, 1844
 Sinuessa Horváth, 1910
 Stephanitis Stål, 1873
 Parada Horváth, 1925
 Teleonemia Costa, 1864
 Tigava Stål, 1858
 Tingis Fabricius, 1803
 Vatiga Drake & Hambleton, 1946

References

Further reading

External links

 

Tingidae
Hemiptera tribes
Articles created by Qbugbot